The 2014–15 Kennesaw State Owls women's basketball team will represent Kennesaw State University in the 2014–15 NCAA Division I women's basketball season. The Owls were coached by third year head coach Nitra Perry and were a member of the Atlantic Sun Conference. They finished the season 17-13, 6-8 in A-Sun for a three way tie for a fourth-place finish. They lost in the quarterfinals of the 2015 Atlantic Sun women's basketball tournament to Jacksonville. Despite with 17 wins, they were not invited to a postseason tournament.

Media
All home games and conference road will be shown on ESPN3 or A-Sun.TV. Non conference road games will typically be available on the opponents website.

Roster

Schedule

|-
!colspan=9 style="background:#EEB111;"|Exhibition

|-
!colspan=9 style="background:black; color:#EEB111;"|Regular Season

|-
!colspan=9 style="background:#EEB111;"|2015 Atlantic Sun Tournament

See also
 2014–15 Kennesaw State Owls men's basketball team

References

Kennesaw State
Kennesaw State Owls women's basketball seasons